Churtan (Surtan) is a rural locality (a village) in Uslinsky Selsoviet, Sterlitamaksky District, Bashkortostan, Russia. The population was 474 as of 2010. There are 6 streets.

Geography 
Churtan is located 34 km northwest of Sterlitamak (the district's administrative centre) by road. Uslybash is the nearest rural locality.

References 

Rural localities in Sterlitamaksky District